Boatswain Bird can refer to:

Another name for the red-billed tropicbird
Boatswain Bird Island, a small uninhabited island nature reserve, home to many boatswain birds and other species, off the coast of Ascension Island.